Australian Geographer (The Australian Geographer until 1975) is a quarterly peer-reviewed academic journal published by the Geographical Society of New South Wales since August 1928. Covering all aspects of Australian geography, it is currently copublished with Taylor & Francis.

References

External links

Further reading

Taylor & Francis academic journals
Geography journals
Publications established in 1928
English-language journals